Ab Dalan-e Mirki (also Romanized as Āb Dālān-e Mīrkī; also known as Ābdālān) is a village in Ozgoleh Rural District, Ozgoleh District, Salas-e Babajani County, Kermanshah Province, Iran. At the 2006 census, its population was 165, in 32 families.

References 

Populated places in Salas-e Babajani County